The Very Best of Osibisa is a 3-CD set unauthorised compilation bringing together three Osibisa's albums: Welcome Home, Ojah Awake and Africa We Go Go, released in 2001 by Prestige Records under catalog #205886-349. Do not confuse with other compilations released under the same name, such as "The Very Best of Osibisa" released in 2009 by Golden Stool label.

Track listing
CD 1: 40:41
"Sunshine Day" - 5:00
"Welcome Home" - 4:18
"Densu" - 5:22
"Choboi" - 5:08
"Do It" - 4:24
"Right Now" - 3:11
"Seaside Meditation" - 5:17
"Uhuru" - 3:27
"Kolomashie" - 4:34

CD 2: 40:32
"Coffee Song" - 3:15
"The Warrior" - 3:45
"Flying Bird" - 4:49
"Cherry Field" - 4:27
"Dance The Body Music" - 3:49
"Ojah Awake" - 4:56
"Keep On Trying" - 5:26
"Hamattan" - 6:06
"Sakabo" - 3:59

CD 3: 41:47
"Time Is Right" - 5:32
"Get Up" - 5:22
"Gumbe" - 4:46
"Soldier" - 3:29
"Jumbo" - 1:36
"Abele" - 3:55
"Kyrie Eleison" - 6:24
"Africa We Go Go" - 4:16
"Lost Fisherman" - 2:35
"Sakura" - 3:52

Credits
This compilation ℗ 2001 Musicline S.R.O and Copyright © JM Sontel AG, Gisikon, Switzerland licensed by Prestige Records Ltd., London, England.
Distributed by TIM - The International Music Company AG, Hamburg, Germany.
Artwork by D&H Hommage GmbH.

References
All information gathered from back cover 3-CD set compilation released in 2001 by Musicline S.R.O.

2001 compilation albums
Osibisa albums
Prestige Records compilation albums